Hellefjord is a fjord in King Frederick VIII Land, northeastern Greenland.

History
Hellefjord was named by the 1906-1908 Denmark expedition, after the German word for "light", in contrast with the "dark" Mørkefjord to the north.

Geography
This fjord is located in Daniel Bruun Land, east of Danmarkshavn. There are two parallel fjords to the north of it, Mørkefjord and Sælsøen, a lake with a fjord structure. It runs from east to west for nearly 30 km. Its mouth is in northern Dove Bay.

See also
List of fjords of Greenland

References

External links
Den grønlandske Lods - Geodatastyrelsen 

Fjords of Greenland